In Greek mythology, the river Phlegethon (Φλεγέθων, English translation: "flaming") or Pyriphlegethon (Πυριφλεγέθων, English translation: "fire-flaming") was one of the five rivers in the infernal regions of the underworld, along with the rivers Styx, Lethe, Cocytus, and Acheron. Plato describes it as "a stream of fire, which coils round the  earth and flows into the depths of Tartarus". It was parallel to the river Styx. It is said that the goddess Styx was in love with Phlegethon, but she was consumed by his flames and sent to Hades. Eventually, when Hades allowed her river to flow through, they reunited.

Literary depictions
In Oedipus by Seneca the Younger, the first singing of the chorus, which mainly describes the plague that has settled in Thebes, includes the line, "Phlegethon has changed his course and mingled Styx with Theban streams." While this is not essential to the plot of the play, the line figuratively serves to suggest Death has become physically present in Thebes. The line also reveals the common preoccupation with death and magic found in Roman tragedy.

In Dante's Inferno Phlegethon is described as a river of blood that boils souls.  It is in the Seventh Circle of Hell, which punishes those who committed crimes of violence against their fellow men (see Canto XII, 46–48); murderers, tyrants, and the like. By causing hot blood to flow through their violent deeds in life, they are now sunk in the flowing, boiling blood of the Phlegethon. The depth at which each sinner must stand in the river is determined by the level of violence they caused in life; Dante sees Attila the Hun and Alexander the Great up to their eyebrows. Centaurs patrol the circle, firing arrows at those who try to rise above their allotted level in the river. Dante and Virgil cross Phlegethon with help from Nessus.

In Spenser's The Faerie Queene, Phlegethon is found in Hell, and is  portrayed as a "fiery flood" where "the damned ghosts in torments fry" (Canto V, 291–291).

In Paradise Lost (II, 580) John Milton names the Phlegeton (sic) as one of the rivers of Hell, which bold adventuring demons explore while Satan's flight to Earth begins.  Milton also mentions the Rivers Styx, Acheron, and Cocytus.  The river Lethe is also counted among the rivers of the underworld.

In the seventy-fifth of Ezra Pound's Cantos, Pound asks of Gerhart Münch "Gerhart art thou come forth out of Phlegethon? with Buxtehude and Klages in your satchel, with the Ständebuch of Sachs in yr / luggage".

In Edgar Allan Poe's short story "A Descent into the Maelström", the narrator, looking down on the whirlpool from a mountain, refers to the water as "the howling Phlegethon below", signifying its danger and coiling effect.

In the novel Inferno by Larry Niven and Jerry Pournelle, Phlegethon is guarded not by centaurs, but by military officers taken from all eras of history (with instructions to shoot anyone who tries to escape). There is also a wooden sailing ship sunk on the other side, which is inhabited by the souls of slave traders.

In the first arc of the Curse of the Spawn series, the Spawn's creator Plegethonyarre was named after the mythological river.

Track 5 of The Residents' 2008 Digital Album Hades is called "Phlegethon River".

In H.P. Lovecraft's short story "The Other Gods", one of the characters, when discovered by the Outer Gods, makes "a cry as no man else ever heard save in the Phlegethon of unrelatable nightmares", demonstrating that in an instant he has suffered tortures normally reserved for the damned.

In "The Hunch Back of Notre Dame" a four year old Quasimodo is left outside the Cathedral. Foundlings were left there in the hope they would be taken care of. A passing official sees the child and says "Foundling – yes, found apparently on the banks of the river Phlegethon."

In Charles Wright's poem "Driving to Passalacqua, 1960", he likens driving along and crossing the Adige River in Verona, lit by the morning sun ("Fire on the water,/daylight striking its match"), to the Phlegethon: "Phlegethon/He must have crossed,/Dante, I mean,/His cloak like a net as he glided and stepped over the stones."

See also 
 Greek mythology in popular culture

References

Rivers of Hades